Lieutenant General Raymond Fullarton Armstrong  (14 December 1917 – early 1990s) was a South African Air Force officer, who served as Chief of Defence Staff.

Biography

Armstrong attended Rondebosch Boy's High School before attending the South African Military College.

He joined the Special Service Battalion in 1936 and soon thereafter joined the Permanent Force. He was trained as a pilot, serving in World War II and later in the Korean War.

He was Armed Forces attache in Washington. He served as Chief of Air Staff before being appointed acting Chief of Defence Staff from 1 March 1974 to 30 April 1974. He was confirmed in this appointment on 1 May 1974. He retired on 31 May 1976.

After retirement he served as a director of Atlas Aircraft Corporation.

Awards and decorations 
He was awarded the following:
  
 
  Korea Medal
 
 
 
 
 
 
 
  United Nations Service Medal for Korea 
  Korean War Service Medal
  Order of Military Merit (Korea) 2nd class

References 

1917 births
1990s deaths
Year of death uncertain
Alumni of Rondebosch Boys' High School
Recipients of the Air Medal
Recipients of the Distinguished Flying Cross (United States)
Recipients of the Order of Military Merit (Korea)
South African Air Force generals
South African military personnel of the Korean War
South African World War II pilots
Graduates of the Royal College of Defence Studies
Military attachés